The Indian Scout is a motorcycle built by the Indian  Company from 1920 to 1949. It rivaled the Chief as Indian's most important model. The 101 Scout, made from 1928 to 1931, has been called the best motorcycle Indian ever made.  A second line of Scouts, with heavier frames, was introduced in 1932 alongside the Standard Scout, which replaced the 101 Scout and shared its frame with the Chief and the Four. The small-displacement Scout and the Sport Scout, introduced in 1934, were continued until the end of civilian production in 1942. Military versions of both models were used by US and other Allied forces during World War II.

Apart from fifty examples of the 648, a special racing version of the Sport Scout, the Scout was not continued after World War II. In 1949 an all-new motorcycle, with an overhead valve straight-twin engine, was called the Scout; it was enlarged and renamed the Warrior in 1950.

Between 2001 and 2003, the Indian Motorcycle Company of America, based in Gilroy, California, built a Scout model using proprietary engine and transmission parts.

The first Scouts (1920–1927)

Designed by Charles B. Franklin, the Scout was introduced in October 1919 as a 1920 model. The Scout had a sidevalve V-twin engine with its transmission bolted to the engine casing, allowing a geared primary drive - the only American v-twin to use this maintenance-free system.

101 Scout (1928–1931)

In mid 1928 the Scout Series 101 replaced the original Scout. Designed by Charles B. Franklin, who had designed the original Scout, the 101 Scout had a new frame with more fork rake, a longer wheelbase, and a lower seat height. The geometry of the 101 Scout wheelbase, steering head angle and rear sub-frame were all adopted from the new Indian 401 model which was under development at the same time.  The standard Scout 101 was available with a  engine, but it was also available with a  engine from the original Scout, although this was rarely advertised.

The 101 Scout was noted for its handling and was popular with racers, hillclimbers, and trick riders.

The economic hardship of the Great Depression pushed Indian to the brink of bankruptcy, and the company was purchased by the DuPont family.  In 1931, it was decided to rationalize production by designing a new frame that, with some detail variations, would be used across their entire, new-for-1932 model range of Scout, Chief and Four. Thus the 101 Scout was discontinued,  as its unique chassis was as expensive to produce as the  Chief, and therefore had a small profit margin.

Legacy of the 101
The 101 Scout has been called the best motorcycle Indian ever made.

Enthusiasts have differing views on the replacement of the 101 Scout.  Fans of Indian's technical achievements acclaim the 101 Scout as the pinnacle of Indian technology, while fans of classic Indian styling hail its replacement for bringing classic Chief styling to the Scout line. The 101 is still used in wall of death stunt exhibitions.

Standard Scout (1932-1937)
Cost cutting led to Indian designing a new basic frame for 1932 that would form the basis for the Scout, Chief, and Four frames. The 1932 Standard Scout that was based on this new frame was heavier and bulkier than the 101 frame, and was less successful as a result. The Standard Scout remained in production until 1937.

"Thirty-Fifty" Scout (1932-1941)
In 1933, to appease the sporting motorcyclists offended by the replacement of the 101 with the Standard Scout, Indian introduced the Motoplane. This had a Scout engine fitted into the frame of the discontinued Indian Prince single cylinder motorcycle.

The power of the Scout engine was too much for the Prince-derived frame and the Motoplane was discontinued. The less powerful Pony Scout remained in production and was later renamed the Junior Scout. The Pony Scout and the Junior Scout were collectively known as the "Thirty-Fifty" after their engine displacement in cubic inches.

Sport Scout (1934-1942)

The negative reaction to the Standard Scout and the failure of the Motoplane led to the creation of the Sport Scout of 1934, with a light frame, girder forks, improved carburation and alloy cylinder heads. The two-piece frame, with the front and rear halves bolted to each other to the top and to the engine at the bottom, was heavier than the Motoplane's Prince-derived frame, but also stronger and stiffer. The Sport Scout was still 15 pounds heavier than the 101 Scout.  A specially-tuned Sport Scout won the first Daytona 200 in 1937.

In 1940 the Sport Scout gained full-skirt fenders, a lower seat height and increased fork rake, and in 1941 Indian added plunger-style rear suspension.

Military Scouts during World War II

The most common Indian motorcycle made for military use in World War II was the 741, a military version of the Thirty-Fifty. These were primarily used by British and Commonwealth forces. Around 5000 were sent to USSR under Lend-Lease Program. Indian sold more than 30,000 units of the 741. 

The 640-B, a military version of the Sport Scout, was tested by the US Army and used on bases within the United States, but was not shipped overseas. Approximately 2,500 were built.

Postwar Scouts: 648 and 249

When Indian restarted civilian production in 1946 they produced the Chief only; the Junior Scout, Sport Scout, and Four were discontinued. Engineering work being done on a Model 647 Scout was abandoned in favor of developing a completely new line of lightweight single-cylinder and vertical-twin motorcycles.

In 1948, Indian built 50 units of the 648 Sport Scout. The 648, also called the "Big Base" Scout, was a homologation special built to qualify the type for racing; as such, it was sold primarily to motorcycle racers.  Floyd Emde rode a 648 to victory in the 1948 Daytona 200. The 648 was the last traditional Indian Scout.

Introduced in 1949, Indian's line of modular-engined standard motorcycles included the straight-twin 249 Scout. The 249 Scout was replaced by the larger-engined 250 Warrior the next year. To better compete with European  class twins, the same engine was enlarged to 500 cc, introduced in 1951 as the Warrior.

Land speed records

Between 1962 and 1967, New Zealander Burt Munro used a modified 1920 Indian Scout to set flying mile land speed records at the Bonneville Salt Flats. His records were:

Munro's efforts were dramatized in the 2005 film The World's Fastest Indian.

"Gilroy" Scout

The Indian Motorcycle Company of America, based in Gilroy, California, built a Scout model from 2001 to 2003. The 2001 Scout had an 88 cubic inch engine and a five-speed transmission; these were assembled at Indian's factory from engine parts made by S&S Cycle and transmission parts made by RevTech. The Scout was available in different versions, including Centennial, Springfield and Deluxe editions.

The Indian Motorcycle Company of America ended production of motorcycles in 2003 and went into liquidation. The Indian brand was revived by the Indian Motorcycle Company, based in Kings Mountain, North Carolina, in 2006, but the Scout name was not used.

2015 Scout

In 2011, Polaris Industries bought the Indian Motorcycle Company. For the 2015 model year, under Polaris's ownership, Indian introduced a new Scout model. The 2015 Scout is a cruiser with a  liquid-cooled, V-twin engine and a frame formed by multiple aluminum alloy castings bolted to each other and to the engine. The Scout came with braided brake lines and a belt instead of a chain which reduced maintenance as well as costs.

A lower cost version of the Scout was introduced in 2016 called the Scout Sixty. It is essentially identical to the Scout and uses the same frame, brakes and suspension, but has a smaller  engine mated to a 5-speed gearbox with a blacked out design.

Notes

References

External links
Indian 741 Scout on display at U.S. Veterans Memorial Museum, Huntsville, AL

Scout
Motorcycle land speed record
Motorcycles introduced in the 1920s
Motorcycles introduced in the 1910s